Ilija Ranitović (Serbian Cyrillic: Илија Ранитовић; born 6 February 1987) is a Montenegrin former middle-distance track runner. He represented Montenegro at the 2009 World Championships in Athletics and 2009 Mediterranean Games. Ranitović is a Montenegrin national record-holder for various sprint relay and indoor disciplines.

Running career
Ranitović took up middle-distance track running with athletics club AK Mornar Bar. In 2009, Ranitović had the best season in his career, first running the 800 metres at the 2009 Mediterranean Games in a time of 1:52.62. Ranitović was one of only two athletes selected by Montenegro to compete at the 2009 World Championships in Athletics, and he ended up recording a time of 1:53.17 in the second heat of the 800 metre race.

References

External links
All-Athletics profile of Ilija Ranitovic

1987 births
Living people
Montenegrin male middle-distance runners
People from Bar, Montenegro
World Athletics Championships athletes for Montenegro
Athletes (track and field) at the 2009 Mediterranean Games
Mediterranean Games competitors for Montenegro